Lutai is a town in and the seat of Ninghe District, in the northeast of Tianjin, People's Republic of China. In the late 19th and early 20th centuries, it was the terminus for the Lutai Canal and the first extension of the Kaiping Tramway. , it had 28 residential communities and 37 villages under its administration.

See also
List of township-level divisions of Tianjin

References

Towns in Tianjin